Charles Clémencet (17035 August 1778) was a French Benedictine historian.

He was born in Painblanc, in present-day Côte-d'Or, and was one of the authors who helped complete the great chronological work  (the usual short form of a long title). He also wrote part of the monumental Histoire littéraire de la France, and the history of the abbey of Port Royal. He died in Paris.

Main publications 
1750: , with Maurus Dantine 
1753: 
1755–1757: (10 volumes)
1758: 
1759: 
1760:  (3 volumes)
1773: 
Collaborations
1733–1763:  (12 volumes)
1847: , tomes XII-XIII

Notes

Bibliography 
  via HathiTrust

1703 births
1778 deaths
18th-century French historians
French Benedictines
Congregation of Saint-Maur
Benedictines
Benedictine writers